Colli sul Velino is a  (municipality) in the Province of Rieti in the Italian region of Latium, located about  northeast of Rome and about  northwest of Rieti.

Colli sul Velino borders the following municipalities: Contigliano, Labro, Morro Reatino, Rieti, Rivodutri, Terni.

References

Cities and towns in Lazio